Naked wrestling or nude wrestling could refer to:

A euphemism for sexual intercourse
Naked Women's Wrestling League: a defunct erotic women's professional wrestling promotion

See also
Nudity in sport
Wrestling (disambiguation)